Ben Peyton (born 1977) is a former British actor best known for playing PC Ben Hayward in The Bill from 2000 to 2002.

Other credits include Band of Brothers, Emmerdale, Welcome to Orty Fou and Holby City.

In 2017, Ben shared his memories of his time on The Bill and his career in general in the second episode of The Bill Podcast 

Ben is now a full-time dad and writer. He writes film reviews for his own website, For Your Films Only, and has previously written for Filmhounds Magazine, Time & Leisure Magazine, The Movie Waffler and We Are Cult.

On April 1, 2022, Ben published his debut novel, Luke Stevens and the Blood of St George, an action-adventure novel aimed at 10-15 year olds, but featuring plenty for adults to enjoy too. It's been described as “Harry Potter meets James Bond” and that it “hits all the marks that a blockbuster should”. The book is available to buy via Amazon or Ben's personal website.

Ben is on the books of acclaimed voiceover agency, Rhubarb Voices.

References

External links

 https://benpeyton.co.uk/
The Bill Podcast Interview
 https://foryourfilmsonly.com
 http://carryonfan.blogspot.com/2016/09/carry-on-blogging-interview-ben-peyton.html
 http://www.rhubarbvoices.co.uk/artist.php?id=299
 https://www.imdb.com/name/nm0679029/

1977 births
British male television actors
Living people